Below is a list of Canadian plants by genus.  Due to the vastness of Canada's biodiversity, this page is divided.

This is a (partial) list of the plant species considered native to Canada. Many of the plants seen in Canada are introduced, either intentionally or accidentally. For these plants, see List of introduced species to Canada.

A | B | C | D | E | F | G | H | I J K | L | M | N | O | P Q | R | S | T | U V W | X Y Z

 Lycopus — water horehounds
 Lycopus laurentianus — St. Lawrence water horehound

References 

See: Flora of Canada#References

Canada,genus,L